Zhang Jie (born August 26, 1987, Changle) is a Chinese weightlifter and world champion (2011, Paris). He competed at the 2012 Olympic Games in London, finishing fourth in the 62 kg category.

See also
China at the 2012 Summer Olympics#Weightlifting

References

External links
the-sports.org

1987 births
Living people
Chinese male weightlifters
Olympic weightlifters of China
Weightlifters at the 2012 Summer Olympics
World record setters in weightlifting
Asian Games medalists in weightlifting
Weightlifters from Fujian
World Weightlifting Championships medalists
People from Sanming
Weightlifters at the 2010 Asian Games
Asian Games gold medalists for China
Medalists at the 2010 Asian Games
21st-century Chinese people